Air Vice-Marshal Allan Paul Marshall,  is a senior Royal Air Force officer.

Early life
Marshall holds an engineering degree from Pembroke College, Cambridge.

RAF career
Marshall was commissioned into the Royal Air Force (RAF) in September 1991. He served as officer commanding No. V (AC) Squadron. He went on to become station commander at RAF Waddington in March 2016, and Head of Military Operations in the Ministry of Defence in December 2018. In February 2020 it was announced that he would be appointed to the post of Air Officer Commanding No. 1 Group with effect from March 2020. On 22 November 2021, Marshall took up the post of Assistant Chief of Defence Staff (Operations & Commitments) in succession to Major General Charles Stickland.

Marshall was appointed an Officer of the Order of the British Empire in the 2014 New Year Honours.

Personal life
Marshall is married to Air Vice-Marshal Suraya Marshall, and together they have two children.

References

|-

Alumni of Pembroke College, Cambridge
Living people
Officers of the Order of the British Empire
Royal Air Force air marshals
Royal Air Force personnel of the Iraq War
Royal Air Force personnel of the War in Afghanistan (2001–2021)
Year of birth missing (living people)